HD 6869 is a 7th magnitude star located in the constellation of Phoenix. It was discovered on September 6, 1834 by John Herschel and later led to the entry NGC 405 in the New General Catalogue.

References

External links
 

NGC 405
0405
006869
18340906
Discoveries by John Herschel